In algebra, given an algebraic group G, a G-module M and a G-algebra A, all over a field k, the module of covariants of type M is the -module

 

where  refers to taking the elements fixed by the action of G; thus,  is the ring of invariants of A.

See also 
Local cohomology

References 
 M. Brion, Sur les modules de covariants, Ann. Sci. École Norm. Sup. (4) 26 (1993), 1 21.
 M. Van den Bergh, Modules of covariants, Proceedings of the International Congress of Mathematicians, Vol. 1, 2 (Zurich, 1994), Birkhauser, Basel, pp. 352–362, 1995.

Module theory